Tzimis Panousis (12 February 1954 – 13 January 2018) was a Greek musician, stand-up comedian and occasional film and theater actor born in Athens, where he spent most of his life. He is often seen as the modern-day Aristophanes. His fans usually refer to him as “Tzimakos” (little Jim). His first wife was Lili Achladioti with whom he had a son, Aris. He later married Athina Aidini and they had a daughter, Fotini.

Early biography 

Dimitrios Panousis was born on 12 February 1954 in Athens to refugees from Asia Minor, Theodoros and Foteini, and grew up in Cholargos. He made his first appearance in the mid-1970s, performing in various pubs, with his band "Mousikes Taxiarhies" (Musical Brigades). Panousis was the vocalist and main composer of the group. Their first (unofficial) album was Disco Tsoutsouni (Disco Willy) released in 1980. It was a bootleg tape, many songs of which were later rerecorded for the band's official debut, their eponymous album in 1982. The band went under the alias "Alamana's Bridge" to make a guest appearance with two songs in the compilation album Made in Greece. In 1986, Mousikes Taxiarhies was disbanded and Panousis went solo. His subsequent successful career showed that he could be a band on his own.

Artistic style 

Since his debut, Panousis had introduced a controversial style of rock music with humorous and sarcastic lyrics. His songs included caustic remarks on the political and social reality of Greece. His varied musical style included mostly rock, but also  reggae  and rembetiko. In his live performances, Panousis delivered sarcastic comments about current events and Greek musicians and personalities. He often interacted with his audience, in a unique type of stand-up comedy, and was also notorious for his on-stage phone pranks.

Discography 
 1980: Disco Tsoutsouni
 1982: Mousikes Taxiarhies
 1984: An I Giagia Mou Ihe Rouleman
 1985: Hard Core (Live)
 1986: Kaggela Pantou (First solo album after Mousikes Taxiarhies)
 1987: Himia Ke Terata
 1990: Doulies Tou Kefaliou (Live)
 1992: O Roben Ton Hazon (Live)
 1993: Vivere Pericolosamente
 2000: Me Lene Popi (Live)
 2002: Digma Dorean
 2003: Dourios Ihos
 2009: Tis Patridas Mou I Simea (Live)
 2013: Obi-Obi-Bi
 2013: Prosehos Voulgares
 2014: Mastura ambient
 2015: I katyusha tou KKE / Igiini Diastrofi

Controversy 

Panousis had several run-ins with the Greek authorities. His second album, Musical Brigades (Μουσικές Ταξιαρχίες in Greek), was briefly withdrawn from circulation in 1982 because of the ostensibly blasphemous lyrics of a love ballad. In 1984, censors placed beeps over some of the lyrics in Mousikes Taxiarhies's third album, An I Giagia Mou Ihe Rouleman (If My Grandma Had Wheel Bearings).

In 1997, a court battle with well-known Greek singer George Dalaras began. Panousis had frequently been making fun of Dalaras in his live shows, showing money coming out of his mouth whenever he sang. The court ruled that Panousis would be charged with a one million Drachmas fine (approximately $3,000) every time he mentioned Dalaras by name on-stage. Panousis's response to that, was to call him "the unmentionable" in his shows from then on, and use his famous on-stage quip, "Ladies and gentlemen, I have 3 million drachmas to spare: Dalaras, Dalaras, Dalaras!"

All this has contributed to the depiction of Panousis as a highly controversial artist. Some regarded him as a modern-day Aristophanes while many considered that his pranks and commentaries were of bad taste. Panousis often used offensive language, while the advertising posters of his depicted provocative images. In one instance,  he replaced the cross of the Greek flag with a communist hammer and sickle, for which he was charged with a four-month probation. In another instance, he appeared dressed as a priest with a medallion hanging around his neck which depicted the head of a chicken instead of Mary. This elicited the angry reaction of Archbishop Christodoulos, the late head of the Church of Greece.

Accusations of antisemitism

Panousis had been accused by the Central Board of Jewish Communities in Greece of expressing antisemitic views, not seldom in connection with his standpoint in the Israel-Palestine conflict. During an episode of his satirical show Δούρειος Ήχος ("Trojan Sound") at the radio channel City 99,5 in 2009, he used expressions such as "Jews - Pigs - Murderers [...] may you die a horrible death" and "[...] the jews control all the banks in the American empire, they control all of the show biz [...]", while also referring to the conflict in Gaza.

In 2013, Greek Jewish organisations were appalled by the use of a symbol consisting of the David star entwined with a swastika (the symbol itself is used by the Raelites) for the posters of his show "Troika Club". In relation to this symbol, Panousis has been using the term "nazi Jews" ("εβραιοναζί" in Greek) when describing current Israeli politics.

Other activities 

Panousis had hosted various radio shows for more than 15 years. He was also the author of six books (a peculiar type of sarcastic essays). Moreover, he had appeared in four movies: the most notable is The Dracula of Exarcheia (1981, directed by Nicos Zervos), where Panousis was the protagonist. From  September 2008 to June 2009, he hosted a 30-minute radio show, called Dourios Ihos (Trojan Sound) at the radio station "City 99,5". The show was later hosted in "Radio Thema 98,9".

Death 

Panousis died on 13 January 2018 after suffering a heart attack at his home in Athens. He had previously been hospitalized after collapsing on stage in December 2017.

References

External links 

. The most complete web site on Panousis.  

1954 births
2018 deaths
20th-century Greek male singers
Greek comedians
Musicians from Athens
21st-century Greek male singers